Luiz-Pereira Bueno also known as Luiz Bueno (16 January 1937 – 8 February 2011) was a race car driver from Brazil. He participated in one World Championship Formula One Grand Prix, on 11 February 1973. He scored no championship points. He also participated in several non-championship Formula One races.

Bueno died of cancer, aged 74.

Complete Formula One World Championship results
(key)

Complete Formula One Non-Championship results
(key)

References
Profile at grandprix.com

1937 births
2011 deaths
Brazilian racing drivers
Brazilian Formula One drivers
Surtees Formula One drivers
Stock Car Brasil drivers